A list of notable characters from the NBC soap opera Days of Our Lives that significantly impacted storylines and debuted between November 8, 1965, and the end of 1969.

Tony Merritt

Tony Merritt is a character from the soap opera Days of Our Lives, portrayed by Richard Colla from 1965 to 1966, Don Briscoe in 1966, and Ron Husmann from 1966 to 1967.

Tony was engaged to Marie Horton but suffered from a blood disease that affected his health and decided to leave the night of their wedding believing she wouldn't want to see him suffer and die. When he returned to Salem, Marie had married his father, Craig. He tried to move on and accept Marie's choice. Eventually, he told his father the truth on why he called his wedding and Craig stepped aside to let Marie and Tony have a second chance at love. However, the trust between him and the whole Horton family was gone, so he and Marie ended their relationship and he left Salem later that year.

Craig Merritt

Craig Merritt is a character from the soap opera Days of Our Lives, portrayed by David McLean from 1965–67, and by Harry Lauter in 1966 temporary.

Ben Olson

Ben Olson was a character from Days of Our Lives, who was the husband of Addie Horton, and portrayed by Robert Knapp.

His significant storyline was in 1965, when Ben and Addie moved to Paris, leaving their daughter Julie behind, and in the care of Addie's parents, Tom and Alice. In 1971, Ben died offscreen from a heart attack, which prompts Addie to return to Salem.

Susan Martin

Susan Martin was originated by Denise Alexander from April 14, 1966, to February 6, 1973, when the character was written out of the show temporarily when the casting office hit a snag renewing Alexander's contract and the contract lapsed. ABC Daytime rushed to offer her a then-unheard of salary/perks package to join General Hospital as Lesley Webber. When Susan finally returned to the show, a new actress, Bennye Gatteys, played her from April 6, 1973, to October 1, 1976.

Susan was an old high school classmate of Julie Olson, her storyline involved the first major death when her son Dickie Martin accidentally died in May 1967, which culminated into the first Days murder, where Susan kills her husband, David Martin.

Sandy Horton

Dr. Sandy Horton is a fictional character on the NBC soap opera Days of Our Lives. She is the daughter of Kitty and Tommy Horton, Jr. and the granddaughter of original characters Alice and Tom Horton.

The role was originated by Astrid Warner who portrayed the role briefly for two episodes on December 12 and 13, 1967, it was around that time the role was recast with actress Heather North, the actress who played Sandy for the longest duration from December 20, 1967, to May 21, 1971, and from December 23, 1971 to June 16, 1972. North would later be commonly known being the second and most notable actress to provide the voice of Daphne Blake in all incarnations of Hanna-Barbera's Scooby-Doo Saturday morning cartoon series. In 1982, Sandy was reintroduced to the series with actress Martha Smith, who would play the role for four months from August 12 to December 8. Seven months later, the role was recast, this time with Pamela Roylance. Roylance would only last for about seven months, starting on July 18, 1983, and ultimately leaving on April 11, 1984.

David Banning

David Banning, most notably portrayed by Richard Guthrie (1975–1980) and Gregg Marx (1981–1983), is the son of Julie Olson (Susan Seaforth Hayes) and her late lover David Martin.

David Martin, Jr. is born in January 1968 to Julie Olson (Catherine Ferrar) and he is immediately put up for adoption. The child is adopted by Scott Banning (Mike Farrell) and his terminally ill wife Janet (Joyce Easton) as Bradley Banning (Chad Barstad). Susan Martin (Denise Alexander) befriends the Bannings and often helps care for Janet and baby Brad. As Susan comforts Scott after Janet's death in early 1969, Julie (Susan Seaforth Hayes) discovers that Brad is the child she gave up and seduces Scott away from Susan. Though Julie and Scott marry in 1970, by 1971, she's fallen in love with Doug Williams (Bill Hayes) and plans to leave Scott but wants to make sure she can retain custody of David (Jeffrey Williams). As Julie is set to divorce Scott in 1972, she plans to elope with Doug and honeymoon in Portofino and wants to bring David along. However, Doug is not interested in parenthood and he spontaneously marries Julie's mother Addie Olson (Patricia Barry). After Scott's death in early 1973, Julie sends David off to military school.

The 18 year old David (Richard Guthrie) returns in the summer of 1975 with his new girlfriend Brooke Hamilton (Adrienne La Russa). Brooke is jealous of David's growing closeness with his mother Julie and to drive a wedge between them, Brooke spread rumors about Julie being unfaithful to his stepfather Bob Anderson (Mark Tapscott) and potentially being pregnant with Doug's child. David and Julie get into a fight and he runs off and gets into a car accident in which he is presumed dead. David survives and is taken in the Grants where he befriends the daughter Valerie Grant (Tina Andrews). Meanwhile, Brooke learns she is pregnant with David's baby but refuses to marry him because he is in love with Valerie.

In 2017, it is revealed that David has died in a motorbike accident. It is also revealed that he has another son, Eli Grant, with Valerie.

Mike Horton

Mike Horton is the son of Laura Horton, and was named after Mickey Horton, who was thought to be his father, though his actual father was Bill Horton, Mickey's brother. Mike has the honor of being the most recast character in Days of our Lives history, having been played by sixteen different actors since his character's birth in 1968. He's also been the most constantly aged and deaged. His most well known (and longest lasting) portrayers were Wesley Eure from June 6, 1974, to January 16, 1981, Michael T. Weiss from August 8, 1985, to March 1, 1990, and Roark Critchlow from April 27, 1994, to November 19, 1999, and June 23 to 28, 2010.

Mike grew up knowing his father as town lawyer Mickey Horton and was as shocked as Mickey was to learn that his true father is the man he thought was his uncle Bill, who drunkenly raped his mother, Dr. Laura Spencer, while she was married to Mickey. Although Mike has become a bit closer to Bill through the years, he still considers Mickey to be his father.

Mike was married for the first time very young to Margo Anderman and his wife died in the summer of 1980 of leukemia. He left town not long after that happened, but later returned and began a residency at Salem University, while looking after his teenage sister, Jennifer. During this time, he began a relationship with Dr. Robin Jacobs, which was made difficult by their different religions, Robin was devoutly Jewish and Mike was Catholic and she wouldn't allow herself to marry inter-faith. Although Mike wanted to convert in order to make the relationship work, he eventually realized that wouldn't be fair to either of them and Robin left town to live in Israel. Sometime later Mike learned that Robin had given birth to his son, Jeremy. Mike left Salem in 1990 to join Robin and Jeremy and try to make a family.

In 1994, Mike returned to Salem, it having not worked out between him and Robin. He was soon made chief of staff at Salem University Hospital, over rival Craig Wesley.  Craig convinces nurse Ali McIntyre to pursue a relationship with Mike to get the head nurse's job, but when she doesn't get the job she sues Mike and the hospital for sexual harassment.  During this, he began an affair with Carrie Brady Reed, who worked in Public Relations at the hospital. Eventually Carrie's husband Austin Reed found out, and the two divorced.  Mike and Carrie devised a plan to get Ali to admit what she and Craig were planning, but when she figured it out, she drugged and kidnapped Mike.  She planned to force him to elope with her, but Roman Brady caught and arrested her.  Ali was declared mentally unstable and institutionalized.  Mike and Carrie got together officially and left Salem together to return to Israel, as Mike wanted to continue to have a relationship with his son. While off-screen, Mike and Carrie split up and his son Jeremy returned to Salem for a brief period.

Mike returned to Salem in June 2010 when he received news that his grandmother, Alice Horton was extremely ill. Mike returned along with many other family members. While on his way to Alice's, he was involved in a car accident and was injured. He was brought to University Hospital where he was treated. His goal was to get better quickly so he could visit his grandmother one last time. Several days later, he received news from Bill and Jennifer Horton that Alice had died. He reminisced about the wonderful times he shared with Alice. Before leaving Salem, he hung up a plaque in the hospital in honor of his late grandmother.

Mike returned in 2022 where he made amends with Nancy Wesley and took Jennifer to rehab after she relapsed in her painkiller addiction.

See also 
 Days of Our Lives characters
 Days of Our Lives characters (1970s)
 Days of Our Lives characters (1980s)
 Days of Our Lives characters (1990s)
 Days of Our Lives characters (2000s)
 Days of Our Lives characters (2010s)
 Days of Our Lives cast members
 List of previous Days of Our Lives cast members

Notes and references

1960s